Armand Joseph Overnay (1 November 1798 – 14 September 1869) was a 19th-century French chansonnier and playwright.

He was a son of the chansonnier Nicolas Jean Marie Overnay (born in 1769), one of the members of the Soupers de Momus, and an examiner of dramatic works. Armand Joseph Overnay's plays were presented on the most important Parisian stages of his time including the Théâtre de l'Ambigu-Comique, the Théâtre des Folies-Dramatiques, the Théâtre du Palais-Royal, the Théâtre du Gymnase, and the Théâtre de la Porte-Saint-Antoine.

Works 

1819: Les Bolivars et les Morillos, caricatures in action, in 1 act mingled with vaudevilles, with Gabriel de Lurieu
1820: Le Mari confident, comédie-vaudeville in 1 act, with Jean Berrier and E. F. Varez
1821: L'Épicurien malgré lui, vaudeville in 1 act, with Berrier
1823: Les Deux Lucas, vaudeville in 1 act, with Berrier
1823: Fanny, melodrama in 3 acts, [extravaganza]], with Lamarque de Saint-Victor
1824: Félix et Roger, one-act play, with Berrier and Hippolyte Lévesque
1825: L'Entrée à Reims, divertissement in 1 act, with Antoine-Marie Coupart and Jacques-André Jacquelin
1825: Les Deux réputations, comédie-vaudeville in 1 act, with Théodore Nézel
1826: Six mois de constance, comédy in 1 act, mingled with couplets, with Nézel and Berrier
1826: Le Banqueroutier, melodrama in 3 acts, with Nézel
1826: La Couturière, drama in 3 acts, with Nézel
1826: La Nuit des noces, drama in 3 acts, with Nézel
1826: La dame voilée, comedy in 3 acts, with Berrier and Nézel
1826: La Chambre de Clairette, ou les Visites par la fenêtre, vaudeville in 1 act, with Nézel
1827: Cartouche, melodrama in 3 acts, with Nézel
1827: Sainte-Périne, ou l'Asile des vieillards, tableau-vaudeville in 1 act, with Théaulon and Eugène de Lamerlière
1828: Le Chasseur noir, melodrama in 3 acts extravaganza, with Benjamin Antier, Frédérick Lemaître and Nézel
1830: Les lanciers et les marchandes de modes, one-act play, mingled with couplets, with Antier, Nézel and Varez
1830: Je ne chanterai plus ou Les derniers moments d'un épicurien, romance, adagio
1831: John Bull, ou le Chaudronnier anglais, play in 2 acts, with Nézel and Varez
1831: La Fille unique, vaudeville in 1 act, with Michel-Nicolas Balisson de Rougemont and Saint-Amand
1831: Le Watchman, drama in 3 acts and 6 tableaux, with Antier and Adrien Payn
1831: Le Tir et le restaurant, comédie-vaudeville in 1 act, with Nézel and Payn
1831: Les Fous dramatiques, vaudeville in 1 act, with Saint-Amand
1833: Marie-Rose, ou la Nuit de Noël, drama in 3 acts, with Saint-Amand and Payn
1834: Judith et Holopherne, an episode of the first war of Spain, vaudeville in 2 acts, with Emmanuel Théaulon and Nézel
1835: L'heure du rendez-vous
1835: Un talisman sous M. de Sartines, vaudeville in 1 act, with Nézel
1836: Le Doyen de Killerine, comédie-vaudeville in 2 acts, after the novel by abbé Prévost, with Payn
1837: Lebel, ou Le premier valet de chambre, comédie-vaudeville en un act
1838: L'Enfant de Paris, ou Misère et liberté, vaudeville in 1 act, with Nézel
1840: La Peur du tonnerre, vaudeville in 1 act, with Payn
1846: Souvenir de l'Empire, comédie-vaudeville in 2 acts
1850: Les Deux célibats, comedy in 3 acts, in prose, with Jules de Wailly
1850: La famille du mari, comedy in 3 acts, with de Wailly
1851: Contre fortune bon cœur, comédie-vaudeville in 1 act, with de Wailly

See also
Gabriel-Alexandre Belle

Bibliography 
 Joseph Marie Quérard, Félix Bourquelot, Charles Louandre, La littérature française contemporaine. XIXe siècle, 1854, p. 569-570 
 Pierre LaroueGabriel-Alexandre Bellesse, Grand dictionnaire universel du XIXe siècle (suppl.), vol.16, 1864
 Jules Gay, Bibliographie des ouvrages relatifs à l'amour, aux femmes, 1872, p. 397

19th-century French dramatists and playwrights
French chansonniers
1798 births
Writers from Paris
1853 deaths